The 1980 Norwegian Football Cup was the 75th edition of the Norwegian annual knockout football tournament. The Cup was won by Vålerengen after beating Lillestrøm in the cup final with the score 4–1. This was Vålerengen's first Norwegian Cup title.

First round

|colspan="3" style="background-color:#97DEFF"|27 May 1980

|-
|colspan="3" style="background-color:#97DEFF"|28 May 1980

|-
|colspan="3" style="background-color:#97DEFF"|29 May 1980

|-
|colspan="3" style="background-color:#97DEFF"|3 June 1980

|-
|colspan="3" style="background-color:#97DEFF"|4 June 1980

|-
|colspan="3" style="background-color:#97DEFF"|5 June 1980

|-
|colspan="3" style="background-color:#97DEFF"|11 June 1980

|-
|colspan="3" style="background-color:#97DEFF"|12 June 1980

|-
|colspan="3" style="background-color:#97DEFF"|Replay: 4 June 1980

|-
|colspan="3" style="background-color:#97DEFF"|Replay: 5 June 1980

|-
|colspan="3" style="background-color:#97DEFF"|Replay: 11 June 1980

|}

Second round

|colspan="3" style="background-color:#97DEFF"|17 June 1980

|-
|colspan="3" style="background-color:#97DEFF"|18 June 1980

|-
|colspan="3" style="background-color:#97DEFF"|19 June 1980

|-
|colspan="3" style="background-color:#97DEFF"|Replay: 25 June 1980

|}

Third round

|colspan="3" style="background-color:#97DEFF"|3 July 1980

|-
|colspan="3" style="background-color:#97DEFF"|4 July 1980

|-
|colspan="3" style="background-color:#97DEFF"|5 July 1980

|-
|colspan="3" style="background-color:#97DEFF"|6 July 1980

|}

Fourth round

|colspan="3" style="background-color:#97DEFF"|6 August 1980

|-
|colspan="3" style="background-color:#97DEFF"|7 August 1980

|}

Quarter-finals

|colspan="3" style="background-color:#97DEFF"|31 August 1980

|-
|colspan="3" style="background-color:#97DEFF"|2 September 1980

|-
|colspan="3" style="background-color:#97DEFF"|3 September 1980

|}

Semi-finals

Replay

Final

References
http://www.rsssf.no

Norwegian Football Cup seasons
Norway
Football Cup